Insult to Injury is the third full-length studio album by American thrash metal band Whiplash. It follows 1987's Ticket to Mayhem. It was seven years before a largely changed line-up recorded a new album, Cult of One.

This album saw the addition of vocalist Glenn Hansen as Tony Portaro concentrated on guitar duties instead of the dual role performed on previous albums.

The original album title may have been Rape of the Mind, Tony Portaro indicated in a live performance video recorded at Copenhagen.

Track listing
All lyrics by Glenn Hansen

"Voice of Sanity" – 3:37
"Hiroshima" – 3:14
"Insult to Injury" – 2:42
"Dementia Thirteen" – 3:02
"Essence of Evil" – 5:59
"Witness to the Terror" – 3:58
"Battle Scars" – 4:27
"Rape of the Mind" – 2:29
"Ticket to Mayhem / 4 E.S." – 4:07
"Pistolwhipped" – 3:17

Live bonus tracks on reissue
"Spit on Your Grave" – 5:20
"Red Bomb" – 3:27
"Cyanide Grenade" – 4:08
"Warmonger" – 3:35
"Stagedive" – 2:58

Credits
 Glenn Hansen – vocals
 Tony Portaro – guitar
 Tony Bono – bass
 Joe Cangelosi – drums

References

External links
Roadrunner Records band page
BNR Metal discography page
Encyclopaedia Metallum album entry

1989 albums
Whiplash (band) albums
Roadrunner Records albums